Demetrius Jerome Stewart (born November 30, 1993) is an American professional baseball outfielder in the New York Mets organization. He played college baseball at Florida State. He has previously played in Major League Baseball (MLB) for the Baltimore Orioles.

Amateur career

Stewart attended the Bolles School in Jacksonville, Florida. He played both baseball and football in high school. Stewart was drafted by the New York Yankees in the 28th round of the 2012 Major League Baseball Draft. He did not sign with the Yankees and enrolled at Florida State University to play college baseball for the Florida State Seminoles.

As a freshman in 2013, Stewart played in 60 games, leading the team in hits (82), batting average, doubles (25) and slugging percentage. He also added five home runs and 59 runs batted in (RBIs). In 2013, he played collegiate summer baseball in the Cape Cod Baseball League for the Yarmouth-Dennis Red Sox and was named a league all-star. As a sophomore in 2014, Stewart was named the Atlantic Coast Conference Baseball Player of the Year after batting  with seven home runs and 50 RBIs. He was also named an All-American by the American Baseball Coaches Association (ABCA). In March, he was suspended four games for his role in benches-clearing brawl against the Florida Gators. After the season, he played for the United States collegiate national team during the summer.

Professional career

Baltimore Orioles
The Baltimore Orioles selected Stewart in the first round, with the 25th overall selection, in the 2015 MLB Draft. Stewart signed with the Orioles and spent 2015 with the Aberdeen Ironbirds, where he batted  with six home runs and 24 RBIs. Stewart spent the 2016 season with both the Delmarva Shorebirds and the Frederick Keys, where he batted a combined  with ten home runs and 55 RBIs between both clubs. In 2017, he played for the Bowie Baysox, where he posted a  batting average, 21 home runs, 79 RBIs, and 20 stolen bases.

On September 11, 2018, Stewart was promoted to the major leagues for the first time. He made his major league debut the next day against the Oakland Athletics. Stewart began the 2019 season in Triple-A with the Norfolk Tides, but was recalled to the majors on May 28, 2019 after posting a .316/.425/.586 line with 8 home runs so far on the season. On August 6, 2019, while attempting to field a fly ball hit by Mike Ford of the New York Yankees, Stewart dove too early and was struck on the side of the head by the ball, suffering a concussion and being replaced in the game by Jace Peterson.

In 2020 for the Orioles, Stewart slashed .193/.355/.432 with seven home runs and 15 RBIs over 88 at bats. In 2021, he slashed .204/.324/.374 with 12 home runs and 33 RBIs in 270 at bats. 

Stewart went 0-for-3 in three games in the 2022 season before he was designated for assignment on April 19. On April 26, Stewart cleared waivers and was sent outright to Triple-A Norfolk. Appearing in 29 games for Norfolk to round out the year, Stewart slashed .256/.391/.488 with 6 home runs and 17 RBIs. He elected free agency on November 10, 2022.

New York Mets
On February 2, 2023, Stewart signed a minor league contract with the New York Mets organization.

References

External links

Florida State Seminoles bio

1993 births
Living people
People from Yulee, Florida
Baseball players from Florida
All-American college baseball players
Major League Baseball outfielders
Baltimore Orioles players
Florida State Seminoles baseball players
Aberdeen IronBirds players
Delmarva Shorebirds players
Frederick Keys players
Peoria Javelinas players
Bowie Baysox players
Norfolk Tides players
Yarmouth–Dennis Red Sox players